Dr. C. P. Joshi (born 29 July 1950) is an Indian politician. He was born in a Brahmin family in Nathdwara, Rajasthan and he is a member of the Indian National Congress. He is the current Speaker of the Rajasthan Legislative Assembly. Previously he was the Member of Parliament of India from Bhilwara in the 15th Lok Sabha. He was one of the first 19 members of India's new cabinet sworn in on 22 May 2009, despite being a first-time member of the Lok Sabha. As a union minister, Joshi held key portfolios like Road Transport and Highways, and Rural Development and Panchayati Raj in the Second Manmohan Singh ministry. Moreover, he was also a Cabinet Minister of the Government of Rajasthan from 1998 to 2003.

Educational background

Joshi completed his primary and higher secondary education at his birthplace Nathdwara, Rajasthan. He finished his graduation from University College of Social Sciences & Humanities, Udaipur with a B.A. in Law, and completed  his Masters and Ph.D. degrees in Psychology. He began his academic career as a lecturer at the University College of Social Sciences & Humanities, Udaipur. Before entering full time politics, Joshi was a Professor of Psychology at Udaipur's Mohanlal Sukhadia University, with a specialisation in Intelligence Quotient.

Political career

Mohan Lal Sukhadia, founder of modern Mewar, recognised Joshi's social commitments and encouraged him to actively participate in politics. He was elected as Student Union President for Mohanlal Sukhadia University in 1973. He was first elected as MLA from Nathdwara in 1980. He went on winning the assembly elections from Nathdwara in 1985, 1998, 2003 and 2018. He is a five-time MLA from Nathdwara and one-time MP from Bhilwara.

In 1998, he became the Cabinet Minister for Rajasthan handling key portfolios like Education, Rural Development and Panchayati Raj, Public Health Engineering, Policy Planning, and Information Technology. He gave a new direction to the significant departments of Abhiyantrik Yojna, Panchayati Raj and Education and made his distinguished presence in these fields.

In 2003, as an opposition MLA in Rajasthan Legislative Assembly, he was appointed the president of Rajasthan Pradesh Congress Committee. He brought the state unit together to win the 2008 Rajasthan Legislative Assembly election only to lose his own seat by one vote, to Bharatiya Janata Party candidate Kalyan Singh Chauhan. He is the second person in the Indian election history to lose an assembly election by one vote. The first candidate to lose by a single vote was A. R. Krishnamurthy against R. Dhruvanarayana at the Santhemarahalli constituency of Karnataka during 2004 assembly elections. He was a prominent contender for Chief Minister of Rajasthan post in 2008 Rajasthan Legislative Assembly election victory, but he lost his own seat Nathdwara.

After 2009 Indian general election, he was appointed a Cabinet Minister in the Second Manmohan Singh ministry on 22 May 2009. From 2009 to 2011, he was the Minister of Rural Development and Panchayati Raj and from 2011 to 2013, he was the Minister of Road Transport and Highways. In 2012, after Mamata Banerjee went out of UPA and Mukul Roy resigned as Railways Minister, CP Joshi got extra charge of Railways Ministry. He resigned from the Cabinet on 16 June 2013 after serving for more than four years to take the charge of General Secretary in All India Congress Committee (AICC). He continued as the General Secretary of All India Congress Committee from 2013 to 2018. He unsuccessfully contested the 2014 Lok Sabha elections from Jaipur (Rural) seat.

After the 2018 Rajasthan Legislative Assembly election, Indian National Congress formed the government in Rajasthan under the leadership of Ashok Gehlot and Sachin Pilot. On 16 January 2019, Dr. C. P. Joshi was unanimously  appointed the Speaker of the Rajasthan Legislative Assembly.

Cricket Administration

Dr. C.P. Joshi has also dabbled in cricket administration. He is a two-time president of Rajasthan Cricket Association (RCA). In 2009, he contested against former IPL commissioner Lalit Modi and became the president of RCA for the first time. Again in 2017, he defeated Lalit Modi's son Ruchir Modi and became RCA president for the second time. Vaibhav Gehlot, son of Rajasthan chief minister Ashok Gehlot, succeeded C.P. Joshi as the president of RCA in October 2019. The newly elected executive committee appointed Joshi as the 'chief patron' of Rajasthan Cricket Association and president Vaibhav Gehlot said he will work under the guidance of Joshi.

References

External links
 Speaker
  C P Joshi

Rajasthani politicians
India MPs 2009–2014
Members of the Cabinet of India
1950 births
Living people
Speakers of the Rajasthan Legislative Assembly
Lok Sabha members from Rajasthan
United Progressive Alliance candidates in the 2014 Indian general election
Academic staff of Mohanlal Sukhadia University
Indian National Congress politicians
People from Rajsamand district
People from Bhilwara
Rajasthan MLAs 2018–2023